The discography of Europe, a Swedish hard rock band, consists of 11 studio albums, 35 singles, eight live albums, one extended play (EP), 24 music videos and 11 video albums. This list does not include solo material or side projects performed by the band members.

The band was formed under the name Force by vocalist Joey Tempest and guitarist John Norum in Upplands Väsby in 1979. After changing its name to Europe and winning a national talent contest in 1982, the band signed with the independent label Hot Records and released its debut album Europe in 1983 and Wings of Tomorrow in 1984. Europe subsequently signed with Epic Records in 1985 and released its third album, The Final Countdown in 1986. The band released two more albums, Out of This World in 1988 and Prisoners in Paradise in 1991, before going on hiatus in 1992.

After a one-off performance in Stockholm on New Year's Eve 1999, Europe reunited in 2003 and released  Start from the Dark, which peaked at number 2 on the Swedish album chart in 2004. The next album, Secret Society, was released in 2006 and was the first album since Out of This World to chart in Italy, peaking at number 41. The eighth studio album, Last Look at Eden, was released in 2009, and was the first Europe album to enter at number 1 in the Swedish album chart since Out of This World in 1988.

Studio albums

Live albums

Compilation albums

Extended plays

Singles

Video albums

Music videos

References

External links
 Official Europe website
 

Heavy metal group discographies
Discographies of Swedish artists